Gilbert Oscar Erickson (February 10, 1878 – March 26, 1951) was a college football player, photographer, and one of the founders of the National Literary Society of the Deaf as well as its first secretary.

Early years
Gilbert Oscar Erickson was born on February 10, 1878, in Fergus Falls, Minnesota.

College football
Erickson was a prominent halfback for the Gallaudet Bison of Gallaudet University. In 1901, Erickson was selected All-Southern; George Andree was also a halfback for Gallaudet. Erickson was captain in 1902.

National Literary Society of the Deaf
The National Literary Society of the Deaf was founded on February 6, 1907, in Washington, D. C. by Erickson and five other men by the names of John B. Hotchkiss, Rev. Herbert C. Merrill, Albert F. Adams, Rev. Arthur D. Bryant, and Roy J. Stewart. Erickson became deaf due to scarlet fever. He was the first secretary of the National Association of the Deaf.

Photographer
He was the cameraman for the Wallace Press for thirteen straight years.

References

External links
Picture of 1901 Gallaudet football team

Deaf players of American football
All-Southern college football players
Gallaudet Bison football players
American football halfbacks
Players of American football from Minnesota
1878 births
1951 deaths
American photographers
People from Fergus Falls, Minnesota
American deaf people